Cinnamodendron ekmanii is a species of flowering plant in the family Canellaceae. It is found in the Dominican Republic.

References 
	

ekmanii
Flora of the Dominican Republic
Flora without expected TNC conservation status